Looking Back – The Best of Daryl Hall + John Oates is a compilation album by American pop rock duo Daryl Hall and John Oates. It was released in 1991. It contains tracks from ten Hall & Oates albums spanning 1973's Abandoned Luncheonette to 1990's Change of Season.

Track listing
"She's Gone" (Daryl Hall, John Oates) – from Abandoned Luncheonette
"Sara Smile" (Hall, Oates) – from Daryl Hall & John Oates
"Rich Girl" (Hall) – from Bigger Than Both of Us
"Back Together Again" (Oates) – from Bigger Than Both of Us
"You've Lost That Lovin' Feeling" (Barry Mann, Phil Spector, Cynthia Weil) – from Voices
"Kiss on My List" (Janna Allen, Hall) – from Voices
"Everytime You Go Away" (Hall, Oates) – from Voices
"Private Eyes" (Janna Allen, Sara Allen, Hall, Warren Pash) – from Private Eyes
"I Can't Go for That (No Can Do)" (Sandy Allen, Hall, Oates) – from Private Eyes
"Maneater" (Sara Allen, Hall, Oates) – from H2O
"One on One" (Hall) – from H2O
"Family Man" (Tim Cross, Rick Fenn, Mike Frye, Mike Oldfield, Morris Pert, Maggie Reilly) – from H2O
"Adult Education" (Sara Allen, Hall, Oates) – from Rock 'n Soul Part 1
"Out of Touch" (Hall, Oates) – from Big Bam Boom
"Method of Modern Love (Janna Allen, Hall) – from Big Bam Boom
"Everything Your Heart Desires" (Hall) – from Ooh Yeah!
"So Close" (George Green, Hall, Jon Bon Jovi, Danny Kortchmar) – from Change of Season
"Starting All Over Again" (Phillip Mitchell) – from Change of Season

Charts

Certifications

References

External links
Looking Back – The Best of Daryl Hall + John Oates at Discogs

1991 compilation albums
Hall & Oates compilation albums
Bertelsmann Music Group compilation albums
RCA Records albums
Arista Records albums
Albums produced by Arif Mardin
Albums produced by Neil Kernon
Albums produced by Bob Clearmountain
Albums produced by Danny Kortchmar